Idriss Mhirsi (born 21 February 1994) is a Tunisian professional footballer who plays as a midfielder for US Monastir. He is a youth product of ES Tunis.

Club career
On 5 December 2019, Mhirsi returned to Tunisia and signed a deal until the summer 2021 with US Monastir.

International career
Mhirsi debuted for Tunisia in 2013 against Morocco.

References

External links
 
 

1994 births
Living people
Footballers from Tunis
Association football midfielders
Tunisian footballers
Tunisian expatriate footballers
Tunisia international footballers
Tunisia youth international footballers
Tunisian Ligue Professionnelle 1 players
Ligue 2 players
Championnat National players
Espérance Sportive de Tunis players
Red Star F.C. players
US Monastir (football) players
Mediterranean Games bronze medalists for Tunisia
Mediterranean Games medalists in football
Competitors at the 2013 Mediterranean Games
Tunisian expatriate sportspeople in France
Expatriate footballers in France